State-sponsored Internet propaganda is Internet manipulation and propaganda that is sponsored by a state.

Africa
: since taking power, Abdel Fattah el-Sisi was accused of spreading and financing propaganda leaflets in support for his regime's political crackdowns on his opponents and hacking to promote support for el-Sisi.

Americas
: According to researchers quoted by the BBC, the government and multiple competing political parties have used bots. According to a 2017 paper, government-sponsored "spam-bots" have been used to "target journalists" and "spread misinformation".
:
 Operation Earnest Voice, officially started in 2011.
: Bolivarian Army of Trolls, founded in 2017, is tasked with disseminating Bolivarian propaganda and spreading disinformation.

Asia-Pacific
: The former government of Afghanistan used a state-sponsored Internet troll army to push their narrative and exaggerate Afghan Taliban casualties. Sometimes the information posted by the army was picked up by uncritical sections of Afghanistan's media and reported without any additional confirmation.
: Since the Arab Spring and subsequent uprising, the Government of Bahrain has increased its political and media censorship, as well as launching propaganda disinformation. In 2019, Bahrain was listed as one of 70 countries with widespread Internet propaganda misinformation and hiring cyber hackers to censor bad news about Bahraini Government. From 2017 when conflict with Qatar emerged, Bahrain also participated on an Internet propaganda campaign against Qatar and trying to spread sectarian conflicts.
: The 50 Cent Party and Internet Water Army are terms used to describe different types of state-sponsored pro-Chinese Communist Party (CCP) Internet propaganda and disinformation operations. According to an article by the South China Morning Post, supporters of the 2019–20 Hong Kong protests remarked on the number of "50 cent trolls", but Fang Kecheng, a professor at the Chinese University of Hong Kong who has researched Chinese internet nationalism, stated that "the CCP is also acutely aware that radical nationalists may go out of control and cause trouble. So the endorsement is specific to several organs rather than an overall strategy." In June 2020, Twitter deleted over 170,000 accounts allegedly linked to a Chinese government disinformation campaign that targeted Hong Kong and sought to discredit the United States. In December 2021, Twitter removed accounts linked to the Chinese government that aimed to deny human rights abuses of Uyghurs in Xinjiang.
: 
1. India has a large and influential portion of population with strong nationalist fervor, thus it leads to the rise of propaganda-sponsored trolls. Since Narendra Modi came to power, the Bharatiya Janata Party is known for using exclusive troll disinformation to repress and monitor any opponents against his government. In 2019, a European News Watchdog discovered 265 bogus media outlets in 65 countries which are managed by an "Indian influence network". The network of fake news websites were used to target policy makers in the United States and the European Union to act against Pakistan. The aim of those websites is to spread propaganda and influence public perception on Pakistan.
2. Tek Fog is a software application which is operable via a mobile phone. It is allegedly used by the Bharatiya Janata Party (BJP), the political party that has been the ruling party of India since 2014, to infiltrate social media platforms in order to promote favourable viewpoints and target perceived opponents.
: Indonesia has engaged by using state-sponsored troll army to spread propaganda against independence movement of West Papua and accused of promoting pro-incumbent campaign in 2019 Indonesian presidential election. At the other hand, Indonesian president Joko Widodo has accused his opposition group for using propaganda, especially from Russia, to spread hoaxes against his administration. 
: Islamic Republic's troll army, known to be supportive for Ayatollah Khomeini and the current government of Iran, and also criticizing any attempts that against it. In April 2019, the Oxford University Computational Propaganda Project published a study on an Iranian-related campaign on Twitter targeting Arab users. The Computational Propaganda team found that this Iranian-related campaign on Twitter focused on masquerading as Arabic news outlets to gain the trust of Arab Twitter users.
: Due to the sectarian nature of the country, Iraqi Internet propaganda is also ranged between different groups. During the rise of Islamic State of Iraq and the Levant, the group had managed to operate a systematic propaganda indoctrination on the Internet to confuse Iraqi civilians. According from human rights activist Faisal Al Mutar, Iraqi online propaganda has been in full speed even after the death of Saddam Hussein.
: Critics of Israel claim that Israeli State-sponsored Internet propaganda include the Hasbara, Hasbara Fellowships, Act.IL, and the Jewish Internet Defense Force. Supporters generally frame this "hasbara" as part of its fight against anti-Israeli agitation and attempts to delegitimize it.
: Recent widespread protests in regard to the Arab Spring have led to increasing propaganda and Internet censorship in Jordan, laws have been passed threatening freedom of speech. Internet operation by the state propaganda also seeks to weaken the independent voices of journalists in the country. By 2019, freedom of media in Jordan has declined with regard to growing Internet propaganda by the Government.
: 
1. The Malaysian Government has begun a systematic campaign online to defame the Shiites in accordance with the recent ban of practicing Shia Islam in Malaysia since the 2010s.
2. The "Onion Army" (Malay: Tentera Bawang) also appeared at certain pro-Israeli Facebook pages to defend Malaysian government's action of barring Israeli participants during the 2019 World Para Swimming Championships.
3. The Special Affairs Department, often abbreviated to J-KOM from its current official name Community Communications Department, is a government agency of the Malaysian agency that has been used as a political propaganda machine for the Barisan Nasional (BN) / United Malays National Organisation (UMNO) administration to attack opposition parties and political rivals. The agency has been attributed to engage in state-sponsored anonymous political commentators and trolls by spreading pro-government propaganda on the internet, colloquially known as "cybertroopers" in the country.
4. In 2022, Meta Platforms announced that it has removed hundreds of Facebook and Instagram accounts that were directly linked with the Royal Malaysia Police (RMP), as they were used as part of a troll farm to disseminate propaganda and manipulate public discourse about the Malaysian police and the government. Meta added that such actions were against its policy of "coordinated inauthentic behaviour".
: The Tatmadaw and the Burmese Government has sponsored propaganda through Internet and dismiss its atrocities towards its minorities like the Rohingya, Shan, Kachin and Karen people.
: the troll army of North Korea, which is known to be supportive for the Kim dynasty's rule, and anti-South Korean, anti-American, and pro-North Korean regime. They first appeared in 2013.
: 
1. Pakistan propaganda is mostly aiming in favor to Pakistani narratives and censoring reports about Pakistan. In November 2019, security and intelligence agencies of India claimed to have identified and traced more than 5,000 Pakistan-based social media handles actively spreading fake and false propaganda on Citizenship Amendment Act 2019; according to Indian agencies some of them were using "deep fake videos" of protests to incite communal violence in the country. In January 2020, Pakistan's Inter-Services Public Relations (ISPR) was accused by India of recruiting teenagers to spread propaganda and disinformation against India regarding protest.
2. The Pakistan Armed Forces has operated a series of propaganda campaigns over the Kashmir dispute between Pakistan and India to defame India and extend Pakistan's political claim in Kashmir. The troll army, discovered by Facebook, is also known for spreading anti-Indian disinformation in Pakistan. Furthermore, Pakistan Armed Forces has also operated propaganda in order to influence Pakistani Government and to protect the power of the military's authority in the country, labelling those opposing military influence as "anti-state".
: Palestinian propaganda has been used to fight the public relations war with Israel, often by targeting Saudi Arabia, the United Arab Emirates, and other Arab states purported to be "Zionist sympathizers." A 2002 report from Israeli military intelligence linked Iran and Syria with the financial backing of pro-Palestinian propaganda.
: The Oxford University released a study claiming that hired "keyboard trolls" played a role in President Rodrigo Duterte's presidential campaign in 2016. The study said that the Duterte campaign team spent at least $200 thousand and hired 400 to 500 people to defend Duterte from online critics. It also added that the hired "trolls" remain to support Duterte and his administration after he was elected. Online trolls were allegedly used by the administration to silence critics through threats of violence and rape to people critical of Duterte's policies. Duterte, while admitted to paying people to support him online during the elections said he has followers referring to his staunch supporter, Mocha Uson who runs the support group Mocha Uson Blog but insists that Uson offers her services free.
: Qatari propaganda has previously been in line with Saudi and Emirati until the 2017–19 Qatar diplomatic crisis, with Al Jazeera being a notable evidence of Qatari propaganda spreading in promotion of violence, its anti-American view and nurturing Islamist movements. Since 2017, Al Arabiya, a Saudi-based channel, accused Qatari Government for ongoing media onslaught by sponsoring massive propaganda networks in Politico to defame the Saudis and raise support for Qatar.
: 
1. King's Brigade, known to be supportive for the Saud family and the monarchy. Its mission is to denounce any criticisms against the Saud family, and praising Sharia Law as well as lethal actions by the Saudi Government. Recently, it has targeted Palestinians and other opposing the Saudi influence like Qatar.
2. In December 2019, Twitter removed 5,929 accounts for violating their manipulation policies. The company investigated and attributed these accounts to a single state-run information operation, which originated in Saudi Arabia.
: 
1. Ruling party People's Action Party and its youth wing Young PAP have been officially reported to have organized teams to work both publicly and anonymously to counter criticism of party and government in cyberspace since 1995. As reported by the Straits Times, as of 2007, the group consists of two teams, led by members of parliament of People's Action Party, where one team strategises the campaign the other team executes the strategies.
2. There are also pro-party individuals known as 'Internet Brigade' who claim to be not affiliated with the party nor officially endorsed by party, who set up elaborate social media and web pages to 'defend' the ruling party of online chatters and to criticize social-political websites critical of the government and members of opposition parties. They have information about their party's endorsed candidate personal details and events not publicly known and MP elected as their members, Often they have anonymous members, sometimes with fake or purchased identity, re-posting on Internet forums and social-media their published articles
3. The Info-communications Media Development Authority (IMDA) frequently engages advertising agencies to promote civic campaigns and national day celebrations on traditional media, video-sharing websites and social media. Some of these nation-building efforts are seen as selective in choosing the historical narratives, often only focusing the achievements of the ruling party.

: Owing to its long history of censorship, Syria has some of the most extensive state-sponsored propaganda. Since the Syrian Civil War began, President Bashar al-Assad has frequently allowed pro-regime sockpuppets to disinform about the conflict in favor for his regime. The White Helmets, a humanitarian organization rescuing Syrian civilians from conflict zones, is a major target of the Syrian government's disinformation campaign.
: Royal Thai Army have been coordinating with Russian to sow Anti-Americanism, support Prayuth government, and discredit Thailand democratic movement since 2010.
: 6,000 paid social media commentators known as "AK Trolls" mainly spreading pro-Erdogan propaganda and attack those opposing Erdogan (2016). In June 2020 Twitter removed 7,340 accounts engaging in "coordinated inauthentic activity" targeted at Turkish citizens; the removal prompted Erdogan's administration to appear to threaten Twitter with government restrictions.
: During the 2017–19 Qatar diplomatic crisis, the Emirati Government openly allowed and funded the troll propaganda army to dismiss Qatari rejection and spread anti-Qatari propaganda.
: In order to control its population, the Uzbek government established its own social network to spread Internet censorship and propaganda. Even with the death of Islam Karimov, Tashkent remains firm to ongoing political censorship on social media.
: 
1. Public opinion brigades. As of 2017, the military currently employs at least 10,000 members in a special force, named Force 47, to counter criticisms of the government in cyberspace and hacking into dissident anti-government websites and installing spyware to track visitors.
2. In December 2019, Facebook removed 900 accounts, groups, and pages on its own platform and Instagram, due to inauthentic behavior and spreading political agenda. These accounts reportedly belonged to two separate groups in Georgia and Vietnam.

Europe
: the Lukashenko Government has taken a step to spread disinformation in accordance with his rule and, sometimes, in line with Russian troll propaganda, from blaming Poland and Ukraine for instigating problems to lethal threats against activists. Disinformation became increasingly intensified following the 2020 Belarusian protests, with trolls from Russia and Serbia actively participated to spread disinformation and igniting fears for Belarusian population to turn against the protests.
: Internet trolls have become a problem in Bulgaria since the 2010s, with troll armies being used by various political parties to attack and threaten each other. Despite attempts to reduce and end the internet trolls since 2014, the issue remains unaddressed and becomes increasingly intensified by 2020 under the corruption of Boyko Borisov's government.
: Facebook alleges in December 2020, that accounts linked to the French military have been posing as Africans in French and Arabic language websites catering to the region to promote views in favor of France. The accounts promoted claims of Russian interference in the election in the Central African Republic, expressed supportive views on the French military involvement in the region and criticized Russian military involvement in the region. These accounts also interacted with alleged Russian accounts.
: once the leading nations in democratization efforts post-Soviet era, since the election of Andrzej Duda to the presidency in the 2010s, freedom of media in Poland has suffered significant deterioration, with state-sponsored Internet media that aligned to conservative movement attacking liberal groups in Poland, and criticizing European leaders for its politics that is seen to be abnormal. In 2019, a troll farm group aligned to the conservative movement close to the Polish government was discovered in Wrocław. In 2020 Polish presidential election, Duda Government was accused of spreading propaganda to manipulate public and to enhance the authoritarian rule.
:
1. Web brigades first alleged in April 2003
2. CyberBerkut
3. Internet Research Agency, also known as "Trolls from Olgino". Identified as a "trolling"/astroturfing company operating on numerous sites.
: "Online Covert Action" and other missions (like the "77th Brigade) by the Joint Threat Research Intelligence Group, revealed by Edward Snowden in February 2014.
 : although Volodymyr Zelenskyy has polished his image to bolster his reputation and to win support from nationalist groups for his democratization attempts, the accusation that he is spreading fake news emerged since his Presidency, along with his open endorsement to media censorship, his dubious link with Russia, and increasing attack on other free media staffs.

See also
 Agent of influence
 Black propaganda
 Front organization
 Online nationalism
 Patriotic hacking
 Shill
 Sock puppet account
 Vote brigading
 Troll farm

References

External links

Cyberwarfare
Internet manipulation and propaganda
Political campaign techniques
Propaganda techniques
Internet trolling
Internet governance